Jonathan Coleman is the Erasmus Smith's Professor of Natural and Experimental Philosophy in the School of Physics and a Principal Investigator in CRANN at Trinity College Dublin. Coleman's research focuses on solution-processing of nanomaterials and their use in applications. He is most well-known for the development of liquid phase exfoliation, a widely used method for preparing two-dimensional nanosheets.

Early life and education
Coleman attended the King's Hospital School, before studying for a BA in Experimental Physics in Trinity College Dublin. He graduated with First Class Honours and a gold medal in 1995. He completed a PhD in Physics in TCD in 1999 under Prof Werner Blau.

Research and Career
Coleman became a lecturer in Physics at TCD in 2001 and was the Professor of Chemical Physics from 2011 to 2022 before moving to his current chair. He is currently (2022) the Head of the School of Physics in TCD and a member of the University Council.

The theme of his research is the production and processing of nanomaterials in liquids. The main focus is liquid phase exfoliation of layered crystals such as graphite and inorganic layered compounds. This produces liquid suspensions of two-dimensional nanosheets such as graphene, BN, MoS2 or MoO3. Such liquid processing allows the production of coatings, thin films and composites. These structures are useful in a range of applications in areas such as: reinforced composites, transparent conductors, sensors, optoelectronic devices and electrodes for batteries, solar cells, supercapacitors, etc. He has also performed research on other nanomaterials such as carbon nanotubes and metallic nanowires.

In addition to his publications on liquid phase exfoliation of graphene and other layered materials, he has published a number of papers on applications of solution processed 1D and 2D materials. Examples include: the demonstration of highly sensitive polymer-graphene composite strain sensors; printed nanosheet-based transistors and high-capacity lithium ion batteries.

Coleman is most well-known for the development of liquid phase exfoliation, a widely used method for preparing graphene and other two-dimensional nanosheets. Coleman's papers have been cited 98,000 times yielding a h-index of 119. He has been included on a number of highly cited researchers lists including the list of scientists with h-index beyond 100 and the Clarivate Highly Cited Researchers list. To date he has been awarded four ERC grants.

He has given a number of public talks, for example the Irons Lecture at Rutgers University in the United States in April 2017, and the Jacobus van ‘t Hoff Lecture at TU Delft in June 2022. He also participated in the ERC-organised TEDx-Brussels public  talks.

Awards and recognition
Coleman was named the 2011 Science Foundation Ireland Researcher of the Year and was awarded the Kroll Medal from the Institute of Materials in 2012. In 2011, he was named among the top 100 Materials Scientists of the previous decade by Thompson Reuters. In 2018 he was named the ACS Nano Lecture Awardee by the American Chemical Society, and in 2022 was awarded the Tabor Medal by the Institute of Physics. He is also a Member of the Royal Irish Academy (MRIA), and a Member of the European Academy of Sciences (EURASC).

References

Living people
Irish physicists
Academics of Trinity College Dublin
People educated at The King's Hospital
Alumni of Trinity College Dublin
1973 births
Members of the Royal Irish Academy